The 2021 ASUN men's soccer tournament was the 43rd edition of the postseason men's soccer tournament for the ASUN Conference, held from November 5 through November 13, 2022. All rounds of the tournament were hosted at the first and second seeds home stadiums. The six-team single-elimination tournament consisted of three rounds based on seeding from regular season conference play. The Jacksonville Dolphins were the defending tournament champions, and were unable to defend their title, after not qualifying for the tournament.  The Lipscomb Bisons won the tournament after defeating Central Arkansas 4–1 in the final. It was their third title in five years, and third title in program history for Lipscomb and coach Charles Morrow. As tournament champions, Lipscomb earned the ASUN's automatic berth into the 2021 NCAA Division I men's soccer tournament.

Seeding 
The top six teams in the regular season earned a spot in the tournament.  Teams were seeded based on regular season conference record and tiebreakers were used to determine seedings of teams that finished with the same record.  The first tiebreaker was required to determine the first and second overall seeds as Lipscomb and Central Arkansas both finished with 5–2–0 records.  Lipscomb defeated Central Arkansas 1–0 on October 30, and was therefore the first seed, while Central Arkansas was the second seed.  Florida Gulf Coast and Stetson finished with identical 4–3–0 records, and a tiebreaker was required to determine which team would get the third seed.  Florida Gulf Coast defeated Stetson 2–1 on October 30, and earned the third seed, while Stetson was the fourth seed.  Bellarmine and defending tournament champions Jacksonville tied for the sixth, and final spot in the tournament, with 2–4–1 records.  The two teams drew 0–0 on October 30, and Bellarmine was awarded the sixth and final spot in the tournament.

Bracket

Source:

Schedule

First Round

Semifinals

Final

Statistics

Goalscorers

All-Tournament team

Source:

MVP in bold

References 

 
ASUN Men's Soccer Tournament